Moses Austin Bryan (September 25, 1817 – March 16, 1895) was an early settler of Texas. Moses served as Secretary for his uncle, Stephen F. Austin.

Family
His mother was Emily Austin Perry and his father was James Bryan. Born in Herculaneum, Missouri, Moses moved to Texas several months before his mothers. Moses was named for Moses Austin, his grandfather, who had initially obtained permission from Mexico to serve as an empresario to settle Texas. His grandmother is Mary Brown Austin.

His brothers include William Joel Bryan and Guy Morrison Bryan.  Stephen Samuel Perry is his half brother.

Residence
Moses did live at Peach Point Plantation.

Service to Texas
Moses fought in the Battle of San Jacinto
Moses traveled with Stephen F. Austin to Mexico where Moses learned and communicated in Spanish.  Moses also records an account of the battle and reflects Sam Houston into history.  By nature of his communication abilities, Moses was part of the diplomacy between Austin and Mexico.

Historic marker
There is an historic marker for Moses Austin Bryan located in Washington County, Texas at the Independence Cemetery.

Civil War service
Moses served at the rank of Major in the Confederate Army.

Death
Bryan died in 1895 and is buried in the Old Independence Cemetery.

References

Further reading

The Handbook of Texas. http://www.tshaonline.org/handbook/online/articles/fbrar

Dixon, Sam Houston and Louis Wiltz Kemp.  The Heroes of San Jacinto.  Houston:  Anson
Jones Press, 1932.

People of the Texas Revolution
1817 births
1895 deaths
People from Herculaneum, Missouri
People from Jones Creek, Texas
19th-century American people